Jack Campbell (born August 22, 2000) is an American football linebacker for the Iowa Hawkeyes. He won the Butkus Award and William V. Campbell Trophy as a senior in 2022.

High school career
Campbell attended Cedar Falls High School in Cedar Falls, Iowa. As a Senior, he led Cedar Falls to a 4A State Championship in basketball in 2018. During his football career he had a school record 338 career tackles. He committed to the University of Iowa to play college football.

College career
As a true freshman at Iowa in 2019, Campbell played in 11 games and had five tackles. As a sophomore in 2020, he had played in five games and had 29 tackles, one sack and one interception. He returned as a starter his junior year in 2021, recording 140 tackles, two interceptions, a sack and a touchdown. After the 2021 season, Campbell was named first-team all Big Ten, leading one of the best defenses in the country.

Campbell returned to Iowa in 2022, and was named the preseason Big Ten defensive player of the year by Big Ten media. Campbell led the elite Iowa defense in 2022 to a nationwide best in yards per play average and top five in total defense and defensive efficiency. Campbell finished the regular season with 118 tackles, ranking second in the Big Ten and tied for 13th nationally, adding two interceptions, one recovered fumble and one forced fumble. Against Minnesota, Campbell's forced fumble and long interception return, both in the fourth quarter, enabled Iowa's victory despite being outgained and unpossessed.

Following the season, Campbell was given the 2022 Butkus Award as the top linebacker in college football as well as the William V. Campbell Trophy as a scholar-athlete. He was also named the Big Ten's Nagurski–Woodson Defensive Player of the Year and Butkus–Fitzgerald Linebacker of the Year.

References

External links
Iowa Hawkeyes bio

2000 births
Living people
All-American college football players
American football linebackers
Iowa Hawkeyes football players
Players of American football from Iowa